The Classen Library (Danish: Det Classenske Bibliotek) was a public library in Copenhagen, Denmark, created from the private book collection of Johan Frederik Classen at the time of his death in 1792. It was the third largest library in the city, surpassed only by the Royal Danish Library and Copenhagen University Library and existed until 1867 when it was merged with the latter.

Its building at 38 Amaliegade now houses Det Konserveringsfaglige Videncenter, a centre for conservation. It was listed in 1918.

History

The successful industrialist and landowner Johan Frederik Classen was an enthusiastic bibliophile, buying books both at home and abroad, until he had a library. At the time of his death, he left his book collection to the public. It consisted of some 20,000 volumes. The library was to receive an annual sum of 3,000 rigsdaler from the Classenske Fideicommis, a charitable foundation which he set up in his will. Classen's brother, Peter Hersleb Classen, paid for the construction of a library building in Amaliegade, opposite Frederick's Hospital and not far from Amalienborg Palace. The library's collections grew to about 30,000 volumes in the middle of the 19th century.

In 1867 the library was merged with Copenhagen University Library which changed its name to Københavns Universitetsbibliotek og det dermed forenede Classenske Bibliotek.

Architecture
The library was built to Peter Hersleb Classen's own design, presumably assisted by Andreas Kirkerup. The facade has rustication on the ground floor and a loggia with eight columns, showing influence from Ancient Roman architecture. The central library hall is two storeys high and surrounded by double galleries. It contains a bust of Classen.

Today
Today the building houses Konserveringsfagligt Videncenter (KViC), the library of the Royal Danish Academy of Fine Arts' School of Conservation.

See also
 Den Classenske Legatskole

References

External links

 Classenske Bibliotek at arkark.dk
 Images from works
 Birds of America

Libraries in Copenhagen
Listed buildings and structures in Copenhagen
Buildings and structures completed in 1802
1792 establishments in Denmark
1867 disestablishments
Buildings and structures associated with the Classen family
Libraries established in 1792